Mohammad Motazad Bahri (1918 in Shiraz – 2007 in Washington, D.C.) was an Iranian politician who served as the  Minister of Justice from August 27, 1978 to October 29, 1978.

References

Rastakhiz Party Secretaries-General
1918 births
2007 deaths
Ministers of Justice of Iran
People's Party (Iran) politicians
Exiles of the Iranian Revolution in the United States
20th-century Iranian politicians